Golubac may refer to:
Golubac, a village and municipality in Serbia.
Golubac (Mionica), a village in Serbia in Mionica municipality.
Golubac Fortress, a medieval fortified town in Serbia.
Golubac (mountain), a mountain in Serbia, near the town of Guča.